Gerard III may refer to:

Gérard III, Count of Rieneck (d. 1216)
Gerard III, Count of Guelders (d. 1229)
Gérard de Dainville (d. 1378), Bishop of Cambrai as Gerard III

See also
Gerhard III, Count of Holstein-Rendsburg (d. 1340)